Eye in the Sky is a 2015 British thriller film starring Helen Mirren, Aaron Paul, Alan Rickman, and Barkhad Abdi. Directed by Gavin Hood and written by Guy Hibbert, the film explores the ethical challenges of drone warfare. Filming began in South Africa in September 2014.

The film premiered at the 2015 Toronto International Film Festival on 11 September 2015. Bleecker Street distributed the film in cinemas in the United States with a limited release on  2016 and then a wide release on 1 April.

It is the last live-action film to feature Alan Rickman, who died in January 2016 (his last film overall, Alice Through the Looking Glass, features his voice acting only). The film was dedicated to his memory.

Plot
The film opens in Nairobi, Kenya, where Alia Mo'Allim, a young girl, twirls a hula-hoop in her backyard.

British Army Colonel Katherine Powell wakes up and hears that an undercover British/Kenyan agent has been murdered by the Al-Shabaab group. From Northwood Headquarters, she takes command of a mission to capture three of the ten highest-level Al-Shabaab leaders, who are meeting in a safe house in Nairobi.

A multinational team works on the capture mission, linked together by video and voice systems. Aerial surveillance is provided by a USAF MQ-9 Reaper drone controlled from Creech Air Force Base in Nevada by Second Lieutenant Steve Watts. Undercover Kenyan field agents, including Jama Farah, use short-range ornithopter and insectothopter cameras to link in ground intelligence. Kenyan special forces are positioned nearby to make the arrest. Facial recognition to identify human targets is done at Joint Intelligence Center Pacific at Pearl Harbor in Hawaii. The mission is supervised in the United Kingdom by a COBRA meeting that includes British Lieutenant General Frank Benson, two full government ministers and a ministerial under-secretary.

Farah discovers that the three high-level targets are now arming two suicide bombers for what is presumed to be an attack on a civilian target. Powell decides that the imminent bombing changes the mission objective from "capture" to "kill". She requests Watts to prepare a precision Hellfire missile attack on the building, and solicits the opinion of her British Army legal counsel. To her frustration, her counsel advises her to seek approval from superiors. Benson asks permission from the COBRA members, who fail to reach a decision and refer the question up to the UK Foreign Secretary, presently on a trade mission to Singapore. He does not offer a definite answer and defers to the United States Secretary of State, who immediately declares the American suicide bomber an enemy of the state. The Foreign Secretary then insists that COBRA take due diligence to minimise collateral damage.

Alia, who lives next door, is now near the target building selling her mother's bread.  The senior military personnel stress the risk of letting would-be suicide bombers leave the house. The lawyers and politicians involved in the chain of command argue the personal, political and legal merits of and justification for launching a Hellfire missile attack in a friendly country not at war with the US or UK, with the significant risk of collateral damage. Watts can see the more direct risk of little Alia selling bread outside the targeted building, and they seek to delay firing the missile until she moves.

Farah is directed to try and buy all of Alia's bread, so she will leave, but after paying her, his cover is blown, and he is forced to flee without collecting it. Seeking authorisation to execute the strike, Powell orders her risk-assessment officer to find parameters that will let him quote a lower 45% risk of civilian deaths. He re-evaluates the strike point and assesses the probability of Alia's death at 45–65%. She makes him confirm only the lower figure, and then reports this up the chain of command. The strike is authorised, and Watts fires a missile. The explosion destroys the building and injures Alia, but one conspirator survives. Watts is ordered to fire a second missile, which strikes the site just as Alia's parents reach her. They rush Alia to a hospital, where she is pronounced dead.

In the London situation room, the under-secretary berates Benson for killing from the safety of his chair. Benson counters that he has been on the ground at the aftermaths of five suicide bombings and adds as he is leaving, provoking her to tears: "Never tell a soldier that he does not know the cost of war."

Cast

United Kingdom
 Helen Mirren as Colonel Katherine Powell, a UK military intelligence officer
 Alan Rickman as Lieutenant General Frank Benson, Royal Marines. Deputy Chief of the Defence Staff
 John Heffernan as Major Howard Webb, Army Legal Services Branch
 Babou Ceesay as Sergeant Mushtaq Saddiq, Royal Artillery. Risk Assessment Officer
 Carl Beukes as Sergeant Mike Gleeson 
 Jeremy Northam as Brian Woodale MP, the Minister of State for Foreign Affairs
 Iain Glen as  James Willett MP, the Foreign Secretary
 Monica Dolan as Angela Northman MP, the Parliamentary Under-Secretary of State for Africa
 Richard McCabe as Attorney General George Matherson

United States
 Aaron Paul as 2nd Lieutenant Steve Watts, a USAF MQ-9 pilot
 Phoebe Fox as A1C Carrie Gershon, USAF
 Lemogang Tsipa as SrA Matt Levery, USAF 
 Kim Engelbrecht as A1C Lucy Galvez, USAF
Gavin Hood as Lieutenant Colonel Ed Walsh, USAF 
 Michael O'Keefe as US Secretary of State Ken Stanitzke
Laila Robins as Jillian Goldman, US National Security Council Senior Legal Advisor

Kenya
 Vusi Kunene as Major Moses Owiti, leader of the Kenyan Army Special Forces
 Barkhad Abdi as Jama Farah, an undercover Kenyan NIS agent
 Lex King as Susan Danford
 Warren Masemola as Atieno, a Kenyan NIS agent
 Ebby Weyime as Damisi, a Kenyan NIS surveillance agent 
 Armaan Haggio as Musa Mo'Allim 
 Aisha Takow as Alia Mo'Allim
 Vusi Kunene, South African
 Warren Masimula, South African

Crew

 Gavin Hood – director
 Ged Doherty – producer
 Colin Firth – producer
 David Lancaster – producer
 Guy Hibbert – writer
 Megan Gill – editor
 Johnny Breedt – production designer
 Nico Louw – sound recordist
 Paul Hepker – composer
 Mark Kilian – composer

Production

Eye in the Sky is directed by Gavin Hood based on a screenplay by Guy Hibbert. The screenplay was a project initially being developed at BBC Films, and FilmNation Entertainment acquired Hibbert's screenplay from BBC in September 2011 for Oliver Hirschbiegel to direct. Production did not happen as anticipated, and Hood sent the screenplay to Xavier Marchand, president of Entertainment One. Marchand decided to develop it to produce a film with Hood directing. Entertainment One partnered with Raindog Films in April 2014 to produce Eye in the Sky with Colin Firth as one of the producers. Actors Helen Mirren and Aaron Paul joined the cast the following month.

Hood, who was born in South Africa, chose to film Eye in the Sky in his home country. Filming began in South Africa in September 2014. Since the South African Civil Aviation Authority did not grant filmmakers permission to fly real drones in the country's airspace for the production, they used visual effects to display the drones. Hood found practical locations throughout South Africa that substituted for settings in the film: an area that looked like Surrey for Mirren's character, clubs that had the appearance of Las Vegas establishments, and Beaufort West which was a backdrop for the state of Nevada in the United States. The bombed town square was built as a movie set at Cape Town Film Studios. Filming concluded on 4 November 2014. None of the four lead actors—Mirren, Rickman, Paul, and Abdi—met one another during production, instead filming alone with Hood due to their characters' separate locations in the film. For example, despite the two costarring in a pair of films (Eye in the Sky and the animated feature Help! I'm a Fish), Aaron Paul and Alan Rickman had never met each other in person, according to Paul.

Mark Kilian and Paul Hepker, who scored Hood's films Tsotsi (2005) and Rendition (2007), reteamed to score Eye in the Sky as did editor Megan Gill.

Release
Eye in the Sky premiered at the 2015 Toronto International Film Festival on 11 September 2015. The film had its United States premiere on 7 January 2016 at the Palm Springs International Film Festival.

Bleecker Street distributed the film in the United States, releasing it in New York City and Los Angeles on  2016 and gradually expanding to additional markets on the following two weekends. On  2016, the film received a wide release. Deadline said this release was positioned to take place after the 2015–2016 awards season.

Entertainment One distributed the film in the United Kingdom on  2016 and Malta in May 2016. It will also distribute the film in Canada, Belgium, the Netherlands, Luxembourg, Spain, Australia, and New Zealand.

Reception

Box office
Eye in the Sky grossed $6.6 million in the UK, $18.7 million in the US and Canada, and $32.8 million worldwide.

The film grossed $113,803 in the US on its opening weekend of 11–13 March 2016 from five screens, an average of $22,761 per screen. In its wide release, the film grossed $4 million, finishing ninth at the box office.

Critical response
Eye in the Sky received positive reviews. On Rotten Tomatoes, the film has a rating of 95%, based on 175 critics, with a weighted average score of 7.5/10. The site's consensus reads, "As taut as it is timely, Eye in the Sky offers a powerfully acted – and unusually cerebral – spin on the modern wartime political thriller." On Metacritic, the film has a weighted average score of 73 out of 100, based on 38 critics, indicating "generally favorable reviews".

Rickman's performance was well received by critics, with Richard Roeper of the Chicago Sun-Times saying, "Mr Rickman was never nominated for an Academy Award and it's probably a long shot for a posthumous Supporting Actor for this film - but his work here is a reminder of what a special talent he possessed."

Peter Asaro on Science & Film reviewed the accuracy of the advanced military technology depicted in the film, concluding, "keep in mind that while some of the advanced technologies depicted are not yet out in the field, many are only a few years away from being a reality".

See also

 Good Kill, a 2014 film also featuring drone warfare
 List of films featuring drones
 Trolley problem

References

External links
 
 
 
 
 
 Official screenplay

2015 films
2010s thriller films
2010s war films
British thriller films
British war films
Drone films
Films about security and surveillance
Films about terrorism
Films about terrorism in Africa
Films directed by Gavin Hood
Films set in 2015
Films set in Beijing
Films set in Hawaii
Films set in London
Films set in Nairobi
Films set in Nevada
Films set in Singapore
Films shot in the Western Cape
Techno-thriller films
Films about the United States Air Force
Films about the British Armed Forces
Entertainment One films
Bleecker Street films
Scanbox Entertainment films
2010s English-language films
2010s American films
2010s British films